The 2021 Open Araba en Femenino was a professional women's tennis tournament played on outdoor hard courts. It was the second edition of the tournament which was part of the 2021 ITF Women's World Tennis Tour. It took place in Vitoria-Gasteiz, Spain between 12 and 18 July 2021.

Singles main-draw entrants

Seeds

 1 Rankings are as of 28 June 2021.

Other entrants
The following players received wildcards into the singles main draw:
  Mercedes Aristegui
  Lucía Cortez Llorca
  Ángela Fita Boluda
  Ane Mintegi del Olmo

The following players received entry using protected rankings:
  Haruna Arakawa
  Akiko Omae
  Katie Swan

The following player received entry using a junior exempt:
  Victoria Jiménez Kasintseva

The following players received entry from the qualifying draw:
  Alba Carrillo Marín
  Celia Cerviño Ruiz
  María García Cid
  Bojana Klincov
  Verena Meliss
  Sofia Milatová
  Estela Pérez Somarriba
  Laetitia Pulchartová

The following players received entry as lucky losers:
  Olivia Gram
  Mina Hodzic

Champions

Singles

 Rebeka Masarova def.  Ane Mintegi del Olmo, 7–6(7–3), 6–4

Doubles

  Olivia Gadecki /  Rebeka Masarova def.  Celia Cerviño Ruiz /  Olivia Nicholls, 6–3, 6–3

References

External links
 2021 Open Araba en Femenino at ITFtennis.com
 Official website

2021 ITF Women's World Tennis Tour
2021 in Spanish tennis
July 2021 sports events in Spain